WIV Provo Premier League is the top division of the Turks and Caicos Islands Football Association. Despite being a league competition in CONCACAF none of the Turks and Caicos' teams ever played in the CFU Club Championship nor CONCACAF Champions League. 3,000 capacity TCIFA National Academy is one of the used venues.

Teams 
For the 2019 season, the league comprises six teams:
Academy Eagles
Academy Jaguars
Beaches
Cheshire Hall
Flamingo
Sharks FC

Previous winners
All winners listed according to RSSSF:

Titles by team

* As KPMG United
** As Tropic All Stars

Top scorers

References

External links
Facebook page

 
1
Turks and Caicos Islands
Sports leagues established in 1998
1998 establishments in the Turks and Caicos Islands